Bathymunida dissimilis is a species of squat lobster in the family Munididae. The binomial name is derived from the Latin dissimilis, meaning "different", in reference to its relation with and difference to B. balssi.

References

Squat lobsters
Crustaceans described in 1996